A stand-up roller coaster is a roller coaster designed to have the passengers stand through the course of the ride.

History
The first stand-up roller coasters in the world were originally built as sit-down roller coasters. Japanese manufacturer TOGO designed stand-up roller coasters that were first deployed in 1982 on Momonga Standing & Loop Coaster, originally built in 1979 at Yomiuriland in Tokyo, Japan. The same change was also performed on Dangai at the former Thrill Valley amusement park in Gotemba, Shizuoka, Japan. Both rides added stand-up trains in 1982, with Dangai opening one day before Momonga Standing & Loop Coaster.

The first stand-up roller coaster in the United States was also a former sit-down model. Screamroller at Worlds of Fun was a corkscrew model built by Arrow Dynamics in 1976. In 1983, Arrow designed a stand-up train for the attraction, and the ride was subsequently renamed Extreme roller after the trains were added. The track and structure were not designed for stand-up trains, however, and the original sit-down trains were reinstalled in 1984. They remained in place until the attraction was removed in 1988.

Two new stand-up roller coasters opened in the United States in 1984. One was another retrofit similar to Extreme roller called Rail Blazer. It was originally built by Arrow and debuted as River King Mine Train during the grand opening of Six Flags St. Louis in 1971, and the stand-up trains were added for the 1984 season when the attraction was renamed. Like Extremeroller, the track wasn't intended for use with stand-up trains, and a fatal accident in 1984 involving a passenger that fell to her death prompted a recall of the trains. The original trains and name were then restored. The other stand-up coaster to open in 1984 was King Cobra at Kings Island, manufactured by TOGO, which was the first in the world to be designed from the ground up for standing passengers. The attraction operated from 1984 to 2001.

The last stand-up roller coaster manufactured was Georgia Scorcher, which opened at Six Flags Over Georgia in 1999. In 2005, Batman: The Escape at the now-defunct Six Flags Astroworld was disassembled and placed in storage at Six Flags Darien Lake.

Design

Three manufacturers—TOGO, Intamin and Bolliger & Mabillard—have constructed multiple stand-up roller coasters. TOGO's stand-up models feature cars that seat four passengers in two rows of two. Models from Intamin and B&M also seat four riders per car, but in a single four-abreast row.

On a standard roller coaster, the rider is held in their seat by some form of harness, such as a lap bar or an over-the-shoulder restraint. As stand-up roller coasters, by their design, do not have "seats," the harness system must both restrain and support the rider. Typical stand-up roller coaster harnesses are mounted on vertical posts, which allow the harness to adjust to riders of different heights. At the bottom is a seat resembling that on a bicycle, while at the top is an over-the-shoulder harness. TOGO models normally use a lap bar to further secure riders, while B&M models add a seat belt to connect the bicycle seat to the shoulder harness.

With some exceptions, stand-up roller coasters normally feature at least one inversion. These inversions can include vertical loops, inclined loops, dive loops and corkscrews. Only one stand-up roller coaster, the Shockwave at Drayton Manor Theme Park in the United Kingdom, includes a zero-gravity roll.

Installations

Modified stand-up roller coasters

Purpose-built stand-up roller coasters

References

External links 

 Intamin Official Site 
 Bolliger & Mabillard Official Site
List of stand-up roller coasters at RCDB

 
Types of roller coaster